Setiu Wetlands (Malay: Tanah Bencah Setiu or Laguna Setiu) is a wetland in Setiu District, Terengganu, Malaysia. It is part of the Setiu River basin, and also of the larger Setiu-Chalok-Bari-Merang basin wetland complex. With the size of 23,000 hectares, Setiu Wetlands is the largest natural wetlands in the East Coast region of Peninsular Malaysia, combining various ecosystems including freshwater, seawater, brackish water and a 14 km lagoon.

Ecosystem
Approximately 75 per cent of Setiu district is wetland areas, which mainly consists Chalok River basin, Bari River basin, and Merang River basin that converge and form a continuous lagoon. These areas start from the coastal lowland plains of the South China Sea in the east to the hilly areas in western Setiu, that includes Mount Tebu. Setiu Wetlands itself is 26 kilometres long and 1.5 kilometres at its widest section.

Setiu Wetlands is a mixture of riverbank riparian forest, peat swamp, mangroves, brackish lagoons with vegetation and sand islands, seagrass beds and sandy beaches. It is also unique for having a diverse array of interconnected ecosystems, namely the sea, beach, mudflat, lagoon, estuary, river, islands, coastal forest and mangrove forest.

The lowland areas forming the Setiu Wetlands contain a large swath of Melaleuca or "Gelam" trees (also known as paperbark tea-tree) that is rare in this country. The river basin also contains other kinds of coastal swamp and freshwater swamp forest such as nipa palms forest, Bruguiera forest, mixed mangrove forest, Lumnitzera forest, Rhizophora forest, Melaleuca forest, and Avicennia forest. Another feature of Setiu Wetlands is the presence of seagrass beds.

The Wetlands is an area of high biodiversity and very hard to find. From a number of research carried out, 29 species of mammals, 161 species of birds, and 36 species of reptiles and amphibias are found. The Wetlands is also home to some endangered species such as river terrapin (Batagur affinis), Painted terrapin (Batagur borneoensis), and Green sea turtle (Chelonia mydas). Besides that, marine animals that includes various invertebrate species (annelid, nematodes and polychaetes), gastropoda species, and bivalvia species (clams, oysters, and mussels as examples), crustaceans are also available. About 37 fish species are discovered in this area, 18 being freshwater species while the rest are saltwater fish species that enter the Wetlands to reproduce.

Culture
Setiu Wetlands is a major aquaculture spot. The local residents are involved in brackish water cage culture, pond culture, pen culture and oyster farming. It is a large producer of grouper and oyster seeds. Other than that, the lagoon is also a natural harbour for fishing boats of the fishermen surrounding the area. Local industries at the local villages such as the production of seafood-based delicacies such as budu (fermented fish sauce), fish crackers, dried anchovies and belacan (shrimp paste). Small fishing boat-making industry is also carried out by the villagers.

Setiu Wetlands State Park
The Government of Terengganu has stated that the park will be gazetted as the first State Park in Terengganu in 2015 (although Terengganu has a national park within its boundary, and a few marine parks). The decision to create the State Park comes due to biological diversity of the area, the protection of the natural environment, and the potentials for ecotourism. The early phase of the park will involve an area the size of 400 hectares.

References

External links

 WWF-Malaysia Project: Sustainable Management of Setiu Wetlands
 "Setiu Wetlands: Nature's Jewel" - A video by WWF-Malaysia

Tourist attractions in Terengganu
Wetlands of Malaysia
Landforms of Terengganu
Swamps of Asia